Lukut is a state constituency in Negeri Sembilan, Malaysia, that has been represented in the Negeri Sembilan State Legislative Assembly.

The state constituency was first contested in 1995 and is mandated to return a single Assemblyman to the Negeri Sembilan State Legislative Assembly under the first-past-the-post voting system. , the State Assemblyman for Lukut is Choo Ken Hwa from the Democratic Action Party (DAP), which is part of the state's ruling coalition, Pakatan Harapan.

Definition 
The Lukut constituency contains the polling districts of Kampong Jimah Baru, Bandar Spring Hill, Taman Indah Jaya, Kuala Lukut, Lukut, Sri Parit and Tanjong Gemok.

Demographics

Representation history

Election results
The electoral results for the Lukut state constituency in 2004, 2008, 2013 and 2018 are as follows.

References

Negeri Sembilan state constituencies